The Tomb of Wang Chuzhi (Chinese 王處直墓 / 王处直墓 Wang Chizhi mu) is the grave of Wang Chuzhi (863–923 CE), a senior military governor of the late period of the Tang dynasty and the Later Liang from the time of the Five Dynasties. It was rediscovered in 1980 in Xiyanchuan village in Quyang district of the Chinese province of Hebei.

The grave was robbed in July 1994 because of the high artistic level of its wall paintings and reliefs which are of great historical value. Thieves used dynamite to blast their way into the tomb before removing several painted marble relief panels. The tomb was subsequently excavated officially in 1995. One of the panels was advertised for sale in a Christie's New York Fine Chinese Ceramics, Paintings and Works of Art auction catalogue in 2000. It was seized by US Customs in response to a request made by the Chinese authorities and the stolen panel was returned to China in 2001, and is now on display at the National Museum of China in Beijing.

Painted marble relief
Painted on two marble reliefs, a group of servants and a fifteen-member ladies' orchestra. It provides information about the musical tastes of the upper classes during the late Tang dynasty.

Women's orchestra
On the Western wall of the tomb, there are twelve people in the orchestra. In the front row there are five women (from right to left) playing the konghou (箜篌; bow harp), the guzheng (古箏; an 18–23-stringed plucked zither with moveable bridges), pipa (琵琶; lute), paiban (拍板; bamboo clapper) and dagu (大鼓; bass drum) while, in the back row, there are seven women playing the sheng (笙; mouth organ), fang xiang (方響; Chinese metallophone), dalagu (答臘鼓; West Asian cylindrical drum), two bili (篳篥; oboes), and two bamboo transverse flutes (hengdi 橫笛 or dizi 笛子). At the far right of the front row is a female conductor dressed like a man with two children dancers in front of him.

Gallery

Footnotes

See also
 List of traditional Chinese musical instruments

References
 Hebei Sheng Wenwu yanjiusuo 河北省文物研究所: Wudai Wang Chuzhi mu 五代王处直墓. Beijing: Wenwu chubanshe 1998, 
 Zeng Jinshou. China's music and music education in cultural exchanges with neighboring countries and the West. Bremen 2003 (Diss) (Online, see: "Qiuci ji")
 Scots Hammer, Angela: "The grave of Wang Chuzhi (863–923)." In: Angela Scots Hammer (ed.) On the trail of the afterlife. Chinese culture grave in the facets of reality, history and cult of the dead. Frankfurt am Main: Peter Lang, 2003. pp. 61–117.
 Xiaoneng Yang (ed.): The Golden Age of Chinese Archaeology. Celebrated Discoveries from the People's Republic of China. .

External links
  Angela Schottenhammer: Tombs of the upper classes in Ancient China: The grave of Wang Chuzhi (863–923)
 The Transformation of Medieval Chinese Elites (Nicolas Olivier Tackett)

Tombs in China
Chinese sculpture
Chinese music
Tang dynasty art
Jin (Five Dynasties)